Advocaat is a surname. Notable people with the surname include:

Dick Advocaat (born 1947), Dutch footballer and coach
Gunnvor Advocaat (1912–1997), Norwegian painter